Ventôse is a  of the French Navy. The frigate is the fourth ship of its class, and the first French vessel named after Ventôse, the fifth month of the Republican Calendar. The ship was constructed by Chantiers de l'Atlantique at Saint-Nazaire, France, in 1991–1992 and entered service in 1993. Ventôse is stationed in the French Caribbean Sea territories for patrol duties.

Design and description
The s were designed in response to a demand for a cheap warship capable of operating in low threat areas and able to perform general patrol functions. As a result, the Floréal class were constructed to mercantile standards in the areas of ammunition stowage, helicopter facilities and damage control, which significantly lowered the cost of the vessels. The Floréal class were designed for  using modular construction which shortened their building times.

Due to the frigate's broad beam, the ship is equipped with fin stabilisers.

The frigate is powered by a combined diesel and diesel (CODAD) system comprising four SEMT Pielstick 6 PA6 L280 BPC diesel engines driving two shafts each turning a LIPS controllable pitch propeller. The CODAD system is rated at  The vessel is also equipped with one  bow thruster. Due to the mercantile construction design, the four diesels are all located within one machinery room for ease of maintenance. Both diesel fuel and TR5 aviation fuel is brought aboard at a single location at the stern compared to naval-constructed vessels which sport two. The ship also has three  diesel-electric generators located just fore and aft of the machinery room.

Ventôse was armed with two Exocet MM38 surface-to-surface missiles in launchers situated centrally atop the midships superstructure. However, at the end of the missile's life cycle in 2014, the launchers were removed as the French Navy did not intend to replace the capability aboard the ships. The ship also mounts one 100 mm CADAM turret with the Najir fire control system located forwards and two 20 mm modèle F2 guns situated in atop the aft superstructure. The ship is equipped with DRBV-21C (Mars) air sentry, Racal Decca RM1290 navigation and Racal Decca RM1290 landing radars along with ARBG-1A Saïgon communications intercept, CSF ARBR 16A radar intercept electronic surveillance systems and two Dagaie decoy systems. 

The frigate is equipped with a  helicopter landing pad located on the stern and a  hangar. The ship is capable of operating the embarked Eurocopter AS565 Panther up to sea state 5. Ventôse is capable of operating helicopters up to the size of the Eurocopter AS332 Super Puma. The ship has a complement of 90 including the aircrew and officers and 24 marines with capacity for a further 13 personnel.

Construction and career 
Ventôse was ordered as part of the second pair on 9 January 1990 from Chantiers de l'Atlantique for construction at their yard in Saint-Nazaire, France, and the keel was laid down on 28 June 1991. The frigate was built using modular construction methods which reduced the vessel's construction time. Ventôse was launched on 14 March 1992 and commissioned into the French Navy on 5 May 1993. Following sea trials, Ventôse sailed for Arsenal de Lorient, Lorient where the weapons and sensors were installed and underwent further trials.

Ventôse is stationed in the Caribbean Sea to patrol French oversea territories in the region. The vessel was assigned to the French Antilles, stationed at Martinique. In 2005, in the aftermath of the Hurricane Katrina disaster in the United States, the frigate was offered as part of the French response. However, the United States declined France's offer.

Jo Ann Moore was stopped first and searched, with its four crew apprehended. Leaving a small party aboard the sailboat, the frigate made off to the southwest to catch up with the second sailboat, Sangria. The three crew members on board Sangria were arrested and 45 bundles comprising  of cocaine were seized. On 30 November 2012, Ventôse was alerted to the presence of a smuggler's go-fast boat by an American patrol aircraft.

In June 2015, the frigate stopped a go-fast boat and seized  of marijuana. On 3–4 June, Ventôse moved to intercept the Anguillan-flagged coastal trading vessel Lady Margaret, suspected of smuggling. Lady Margaret was stopped without incident and the boarding party from Ventôse uncovered  of marijuana, which was destroyed. In September 2017, Ventôse, with sister ship , was deployed to Saint Martin after the island was hit by Hurricane Irma.

From October to November 2018, Ventôse trained with the Guyana Defence Force, then stopping at Belém, Brazil before spending the rest of the time off West Africa as part of Operation Corymbe, the permanent French mission to the Gulf of Guinea. On 26–27 May 2019 Ventôse intercepted a suspected smuggling go-fast boat off Dominica. In January 2023 the frigate intercepted a fishing vessel in the Caribbean and seized  of illegally trafficked cannabis.

Citations

References
 
 
 

Floréal-class frigates
1992 ships